Erskine B. Ingram (September 29, 1866 – January 18, 1954) was an American heir, lumber baron, and philanthropist.

Early life
Erskine B. Ingram was born on September 29, 1866, in Eau Claire, Wisconsin. His father, Orrin Henry Ingram, was a lumber baron. His mother was Cornelia Pierce Ingram. His uncle, Julius Ingram, was a member of the Wisconsin State Assembly. His paternal great-grandfather, David Ingram, immigrated from Leeds, England.

Career
Ingram inherited his father's concerns in the lumber industry. He served as the chairman of Investment Securities and Ingram Products Company. He served on the board of directors of the Union National Bank of Eau Claire, of which his father had served as president.

Additionally, he was a co-founder of the New Dells Lumber Company with Pearl Chambers, J. E. Hosford, and Judge James Wickham, and served as its president.

Philanthropy
Ingram served on the board of advisors of the Salvation Army and on the board of directors of YMCA. He was a member of the Kiwanis.

Personal life
Ingram married Harriet Louise Coggshall Ingram. They attended the First Congregational Church of Eau Claire. Their estate in Eau Claire was heavily burned by a rubbish fire at a local city dump in 1953. They had a son, Orrin Henry Ingram Sr., named after Erskine's father.

Death
He died on January 18, 1954, in Eau Claire. He was eighty-two years old.

References

1866 births
1954 deaths
People from Eau Claire, Wisconsin
Businesspeople in timber
Businesspeople from Wisconsin
American company founders
American corporate directors
American philanthropists
American Congregationalists
American people of English descent
Ingram family